Gerold of Cologne was a German pilgrim, who was attacked by robbers, who later murdered him, at Cremona, Italy, in 1251, on his return from a pilgrimage.

References

German Roman Catholic saints
13th-century Christian saints
1251 deaths
1201 births